Gino is a name of Italian origin. It may also be the short form of other Italian names like Ambrogino or Luigino or Eugenio, which are from the Ancient Greek name Ambrosios (ἀμβρόσιος), which means "ever-living", and/or Eugenios (εὐγένιος), which means "well-born, noble". It may occasionally be a nickname.

Notable people with the name include:

People
 Gino (singer), Greek popular singer active in the 1960s and 1970s
 Gino Armano (1927–2003), Italian football player
 Gino Bartali (1914–2000), Italian road cyclist, multiple winner of the Tour de France and the Giro d'Italia
 Gino Bechi (1913–1993), Italian operatic baritone
 Gino Bianco (1916–1984), Brazilian racing driver
 Gino Birindelli (1911–2008), Italian admiral and politician     
 Gino Boccasile (1801–1952), Italian illustrator
 Gino Brito (born 1941), ring name of Canadian professional wrestler and promoter Louis Gino Acocella 
 Gino Bucchino (born 1948), Italian politician
 Gino Buzzanca (1912–1985), Italian film actor
 Gino Cantarelli (1899–1950), Italian Dadaist poet and painter
 Gino Cappelletti (1934–2022), American Football League Hall-of-Fame player
 Gino Cappello (1920–1990), Italian footballer
 Gino Capponi (1792–1876), Italian historian and politician
 Gino Cavallini (born 1962), Canadian National Hockey League player
 Gino Cavicchioli (born 1957), Australian-born Canadian sculptor
 Gino Cervi (1901–1974), Italian actor
 Gino Cimoli (1929–2011), American Major League Baseball player
 Gino Colaussi (1914–1991), Italian footballer
 Gino Conforti (born 1932), American actor
 Gino Coppedè (1866–1927), Italian architect, sculptor and decorator
 Gino Costa (born 1956), Peruvian politician and former Interior Minister
 Gino Coutinho (born 1982), Dutch football goalkeeper
 Gino D'Acampo, Italian celebrity chef, television personality and cookbook writer
 Gino D'Antonio (1927–2006), Italian comics writer and artist
 Gino De Dominicis (1947–1998), Italian artist. 
 Gino Fano (1871–1952), Italian mathematician
 Gino Fracas (1930–2009), Canadian college football player and Hall-of-Fame coach
 Gino Gallagher (c. 1963–1996), assassinated Chief of Staff of the Irish National Liberation Army
 Gino Gavioli (1923–2016), Italian comics artist, animator and occasional comic writer
 Gino Vinicio Gentili (1914–2006), Italian archaeologist and mayor
 Gino Giugni (1927–2009), Italian academic and politician, former Minister of Labor and Social Security
 Gino Hernandez, ring name of American professional wrestler Charles Wolfe Jr. (1957-1986)
 Gino Iorgulescu (born 1956), Romanian former footballer and current chairman of the Romanian Professional Football League
 Gino Jennings (born 1963), American pastor and church leader
 Gino Lawless (born 1959), Irish footballer
 Gino Leurini (1934–2014), Italian actor
 Gino Levi-Montalcini (1902–1974), Italian architect and designer
 Gino Loria (1862–1954), Italian mathematician and historian of mathematics
 Gino Maes (born 1957), Belgian footballer
 Evgeni Malkin (born 1986), Russian player in the National Hockey League, nicknamed "Gino" or "Geno"
 Gino Marchetti (1927–2019), American National Football League player
 Gino Marinuzzi (1882–1945), Italian conductor and composer
 Gino Matrundola (born 1940), Canadian politician
 Gino J. Merli (1924–2002), American soldier awarded the Medal of Honor
 Gino Munaron (1928–2009), Italian racing driver
 Gino Odjick (born 1970), Canadian National Hockey League player
 Gino Orlando (1929–2003), Brazilian footballer
 Gino Padula (born 1976), Argentine footballer
 Gino Paoli (born 1934), Italian singer-songwriter
 Gino Parin (1876–1944), Italian painter
 Gino Perente (1937–1995), American communist and labor organizer
 Gino Pernice (1927–1997), Italian actor
 Gino Peruzzi (born 1992), Argentine footballer
 Gino Piserchio (1944–1989), American actor, composer and musician
 Gino Pivatelli (born 1933), Italian football player and manager
 Gino Polidori (1941–2014), American politician
 Gino Pollini (1903–1991), Italian architect
 Gino Quilico (born 1955), Canadian opera singer
 Gino Reda (born 1960), English-born Canadian television host
 Gino Romiti (1881–1967), Italian painter
 Gino Rossetti (1904–1992), Italian football manager and player
 Gino Rossi (disambiguation)
 Gino Rovere, Italian racing driver in the 1930s
 Gino Sarrocchi (1870–1950), Italian lawyer and politician
 Gino Claudio Segre (born 1938), Italian-born American physicist and author of books on the history of science
 Gino Severini (1883–1966), Italian painter, a leading member of the Futurist movement
 Gino Sinimberghi (1913–1996), Italian opera singer
 Gino Soccio (born 1955), Canadian disco record producer
 Gino Sovran (1924–2016), Canadian basketball player
 Gino Stacchini (born 1938), Italian footballer
 Gino Strada (1948–2021), Italian war surgeon and founder of the Italian organization Emergency
 Gino Torretta (born 1970), American football quarterback and Heisman Trophy winner
 Gino Vanelli (1896–1969), Italian operatic baritone
 Gino Vannelli (born 1952), Canadian singer-songwriter
 Gino Watkins (1907–1932), British arctic explorer

Fictional characters
 Gino Esposito, on the Australian soap opera Neighbours
 Gino Weinberg, member of the Knights of the Round on the anime Code Geass

See also
 
 Gino (disambiguation)

References

Italian masculine given names
Hypocorisms